Eisenhut may refer to:

 Gossan or iron hat, the oxidized outcrop of sulfide ore deposits
 Eisenhut (mountain), an Austrian mountain
 A term for a German kettle hat

People
 Kari Eisenhut, Swiss glider pilot, 1999 Paragliding World Cup winner
 Neil Eisenhut (b. 1967), Canadian professional hockey player
 Thomas Eisenhut (1644–1702), German baroque composer
 Minister Eisenhut, leader of 1525 peasant revolt in Bruchsal, Germany

German-language surnames